The 2011–12 season is Catania's 104th in existence and sixth consecutive season in the top flight of Italian football, Serie A. Catania starts the season with a new manager, Vincenzo Montella.

Coach
Vincenzo Montella was officially appointed as the new manager of Catania on 1 July 2011, taking over the post previously left vacant following the departure of Diego Simeone. A former striker and former caretaker of Roma, Montella was given the task to coach Catania. The Naples-born tactician is currently the youngest head coach of Serie A. His most recent coaching experience was acting as caretaker for Roma towards the end of the 2010–11 season.

First team

Transfers

In
Catania began this season's transfer activity by signing Federico Moretti from Ascoli on 20 June 2011. Other signings include Pietro Terracciano from Nocerina, Keko from Atlético Madrid, David Suazo from Internazionale, and Gonzalo Bergessio from Saint-Étienne. On 4 August, Mario Paglialunga transferred from Rosario Central as well as Davide Lanzafame from Palermo on 7 August. Nicola Legrottaglie transferred from Milan on a free transfer.  Other transfers include Sergio Almirón from Juventus. During the winter transfer window, Catania loaned Marco Motta from Juventus, Juan Pablo Carrizo from Lazio, Osarimen Ebagua from Torino, and Felipe Seymour from Genoa.

Out
Catania loaned out Mirco Antenucci to Torino on 24 June 2011.  Catania sold Simone Pesce to Novara while Gianvito Plasmati moved to Nocerina. Other departures include Cristian Suarino loaned to Nocerina, Ezequiel Carboni to Banfield, Takayuki Morimoto sold to Novara in a co-ownership bid.  On 2 August 2011 Christian Terlizzi left on a free transfer to Varese as well as Raphael Martinho loaned to Cesena on 5 August. Matías Silvestre was sold to Palermo and Andrea D'Amico was loaned to Portogruaro. Other transfers include Nicola Lanzolla to Pisa, Błażej Augustyn loaned to Vicenza, and Federico Moretti loaned to Grosseto.  During the winter transfer window, Catania loaned out Fabio Scaccia and Keko to Grosseto.  Catania also loaned Pablo Ledesma to Boca Juniors, loaned Mariano Andújar to Estudiantes, loaned Maxi López to Milan, and loaned Pablo Sebastián Álvarez to Real Zaragoza. The winter transfer window also saw Gennaro Delvecchio sold to Lecce and Vincent Kouadio sold to Qormi.

Club

Coaching staff

Pre-season and friendlies

Competitions

Serie A

League table

Results by round

Matches
The fixtures for the 2011–12 Serie A season were announced by the Lega Serie A on 27 July.

Coppa Italia

Catania started the Coppa Italia directly in the third round of section 4.

References

External links
Catania's official website

Catania S.S.D. seasons
Catania